Tatiana von Preussen (born 16 October 1980) is an architect who worked on the construction of the  High Line, an elevated linear park, greenway and rail trail in New York. She graduated in architecture from Cambridge University and Columbia University.

In 2009 Tatiana von Preussen, Catherine Pease and Jessica Reynolds set up vPPR Architects. they jointly won Emerging Woman Architect of the Year at the Architects' Journal's Women in Architecture Awards in 2015.

In 2013 her Otts Yard project which replaced a derelict workshop with two green roofed houses, won a Royal Institute of British Architects London award and was shortlisted for the Stephen Lawrence Prize.

Personal life
Tatiana von Preussen is the daughter of Prince Andreas of Prussia and Alexandra Blahova, and granddaughter of Prince Frederick of Prussia and Lady Brigid Guinness; on 28 June 2014 she married writer and journalist Philip Womack, and lives in London. They have one son, Arthur Frederick Richard Womack von Preussen (born 21 November 2015) and twin girls, Xenia Alexandra Selena Womack von Preussen and Amalia Maria Brigid Womack von Preussen (born 29 August 2020).

References

1980 births
Living people
House of Hohenzollern
Prussian princesses
German women architects
Alumni of the University of Cambridge
Columbia Graduate School of Architecture, Planning and Preservation alumni